Pádraig Ó Cuilín (Sometimes Anglicised to Patrick O'Conally), Abbot of Clones, was Bishop of Clogher from his appointment in 1504 until his death in 1505.

References

16th-century Irish abbots
Pre-Reformation bishops of Clogher
1505 deaths
16th-century Roman Catholic bishops in Ireland